The count of Artois (French: Comtes d'Artois, Dutch: Graven van Artesië) was the ruler over the County of Artois from the 9th century until the abolition of the countship by the French revolutionaries in 1790.

House of Artois

Odalric (c. 850s)
Altmar (c. 890s)
Adelelm (?–932)
Conquered by Arnulf I, Count of Flanders and directly under Flanders, 932–1180
 Philip I, Count of Flanders (1168–1180), gave Artois as dowry to Isabelle of Hainaut, niece of Philip of Flanders, for her marriage to Philip II of France

House of Capet 
Isabella (1180–1190)
Louis VIII of France (1190–1223), her son
Merged into royal domain.

Capetian House of Artois 
Robert I (1237–1250), his second surviving son
Robert II (1250–1302), his son
Matilda (1302–1329), his daughter, married to Otto IV, Count of Burgundy
contested by Robert III (1302–1329)

House of Burgundy 
Joan I (1329–1330), her daughter
Joan II (1330–1347), her daughter
 married to Odo (1330–1347)
Philip I, Duke of Burgundy (1347–1361), their grandson, as Philip III

House of Capet 
Margaret I  (1361–1382), his great-aunt

House of Dampierre 
Louis III (1382–1383), her son
Margaret II (1383–1405), his daughter
 married to Philip the Bold, Duke of Burgundy (1383–1404), as Philip IV

House of Capet, Valois-Burgundy line 
John the Fearless (1405–1419)
Philip the Good (1419–1467), as Philip V
Charles the Bold (1467–1477), as Charles I
Mary the Rich (1477–1482)
 married to Maximilian I, Holy Roman Emperor (1477–1482)
 Occupied by France between 1477 and 1493 (Treaty of Senlis)

House of Habsburg 
Philip I of Castile (1482–1506), as Philip VI
Charles V, Holy Roman Emperor (1506–1556), as Charles II
Philip II of Spain (1556–1598), as Philip VII
Isabella Clara Eugenia and Albert (1598–1621)
Philip IV of Spain (1621–1659), as Philip VIII
ceded to France by the Treaty of the Pyrenees (1659)
Charles III (King Charles II of Spain) 1665–1700

House of Bourbon, claimants of the title (1700–1713)

Philip IX (King Philip V of Spain) 1700–1713

House of Habsburg (1713–present)
Charles IV (Emperor Charles VI) 1713–1740
Maria Theresa 1740–1780
Francis I (Emperor Francis I) (1740–1765 with his wife, titular only)
Joseph (Emperor Joseph II) (1780–1790, titular only)
Leopold (Emperor Leopold II) (1790–1792, titular only)
Francis II (Emperor Francis II) (1792–1795/1835)
Ferdinand (Emperor Ferdinand I) (1835–1848, titular only)
Franz Joseph (Emperor Franz Joseph I) (1848–1916, titular only)
Charles V (Emperor Charles I) (1916–1918, titular only, later renounced)

House of Capet, Bourbon line 
Charles X of France (1757–1836)

 
 
9th-century establishments in France
Artois